Ekaveera (Telugu: ఏకవీర) is an Indian novel written by Kavi Samrat Viswanatha Satyanarayana in Telugu language. It was penned between 1929–31 and was published in Bharathi magazine in 1935. Originally written in Telugu, it has since been translated into various Indian languages. This is the second novel of Viswanadha and it is the only novel written by the poet with his own handwriting. In 1969, a film version was released.

Telugu film

A musical film was produced based on the novel in 1969.

Plot

The plot is set up in the late 16th century and revolves around two friends - Puttan Sethupathi and Veerabhupathi. Sethupathi hailing from a royal family falls in love with Meenakshi, an ordinary girl, while Veerabhupathi loves Ekaveera, a young lady from the royal clan in Amba Samudram. However, due to the societal restrictions, the dreams of both the couples meet a dead end.

As destiny would have it, Sethupathi's marriage is fixed with Ekaveera while Veerabhupathi marries Meenakshi. Both the marriages remain unconsummated due to the lack of feelings between the couples. Overcoming the shock of discovering that his former lover has married his best friend, Sethupathi accepts the path of dharma and renounces his feelings for her. He reveals to Veerabhupathi the relationship between him and Meenakshi. Veerabhupathi also accepts the fact and appreciates his friend's honesty. Sethupathi then proceeds to express his love towards Ekaveera and embrace her as his wife.

But, things go wrong as Sethupathi is made in charge of a strategic fort and asked not to leave the place in anticipation of foreign invasion. Communication sent to Ekaveera by Sethupathi about his changed attitude does not reach her as the Messenger sent by Sethupathi gets killed.

Meanwhile, at Madhurai, in a weak moment, on seeing Ekaveera,  Veerabhupathi advances toward her. As her chastity is consumed by an outsider, Ekaveera proceeds to take her life. Veerabhupathi and Meenakshi also end their lives due to the turn of events. Sethupathi, also dies in the process of saving Ekaveera along with her.

Cast

Songs
There are approximately twelve songs and poems in the film.
"Kanipettagalava Maguva" (Lyrics: Devulapalli Krishnasastri; Singer: P. Susheela group)
"Kanudammulanu Moosi Kalaganti Okanadu" (poem) - (Lyrics: C. Narayana Reddy; Singer: Ghantasala)
"Krishna Nee Peru Talachina Chalu" - (Lyrics: C. Narayana Reddy; Singer: P. Susheela).
"Letha Vayasu Kulikindoy" (Lyrics: C. Narayana Reddy; Singer: B. Vasantha, S. P. Balasubrahmanyam and others)
"Oka Deepam Veligindi Oka Roopam Velicindi" - (Lyrics: C. Narayana Reddy; Singers: Ghantasala and P. Susheela).
"Oune Cheliya Sari Sari" (Lyrics: Devulapalli Krishnasastri; Singer: P. Susheela)
"Prati Raatri Vasantha Raatri" (Lyrics: Devulapalli Krishnasastri; Singers: Ghantasala and S. P. Balasubrahmanyam)
"Thotaloo Naaraju Thongi Choosenu Naadu" - (Lyrics: C. Narayana Reddy; Singers: P. Susheela and Ghantasala).
"Vandanamu Janani Bhavani" (poem) - (Lyrics: Devulapalli Krishnasastri; Singer: Ghantasala)
"Ye Parijatammu Leeyagalano Sakhi" - (Lyrics: C. Narayana Reddy; Singer: S. P. Balasubrahmanyam)
"Yeduru Choochina Valapu Thotalu" (poem) - (Lyrics: C. Narayana Reddy; Singer: P. Susheela)
"Yenta Dooramo Adi" - (Lyrics: C. Narayana Reddy; Singers: S. P. Balasubrahmanyam and P. Susheela)

References

External links
Ekaveera on IMDb

Telugu-language literature
1960s Telugu-language films
1969 films
Telugu novels
Films scored by K. V. Mahadevan